Lad lit was a term used principally from the 1990s to the early 2010s to describe male-authored popular novels about young men and their emotional and personal lives. 

Emerging as part of Britain's 1990s media-driven lad subculture,  the term lad lit preceded chick lit.  However, while chick lit enjoyed massive uptake as a publishing category on both sides of the Atlantic, lad lit has had a much more limited usage among publishers, writers, critics and readers.

The term combines the word "lad," which refers to a boy or young man and "lit," which is short for "literature."  Books described as lad lit are usually characterized by a confessional and humorous writing style.

Description
Lad lit typically concerns itself with the trials and tribulations of white, heterosexual, urban twenty and thirty something men, faced with changing romantic mores and the pursuit of a desired lifestyle.  The stories revolve around issues like male identity crisis and masculine insecurity  in relationships as a result of the social pressures and the expectations of how they should behave in work, love and life, men’s fear and final embrace of marriage In other words, the final maturation into manhood.

The first lad lit books ostensibly sought to redefine masculinity. The archetypal protagonist of these books is the young man on the make, mindlessly pursuing booze, babes and football. His ineptitude, drunkenness and compulsive materialism were part of his charm. The figure was created in contrast with the then current stereotype of the pro-feminist, well-groomed  new man and, beneath the crass surface, the lads are attractive, funny, bright, observant, inventive, charming and excruciatingly honest. They are characters who seem to deserve more from life and romance than they are getting.

History

"Lad lit" is a term of the 1990s that was originated in Britain, where it was developed for marketing purposes. Several publishers, encouraged  by the  increasing sales of glossy magazines (Maxim, Esquire, GQ, FHM - the so-called "lad mags", from which the term "lad lit" may have evolved) believed that such fiction would open up a new readership. Thus, lad lit is not its own phenomenon, but rather part of a larger cultural and socioeconomic movement.

Slightly later, with the explosive rise of chick lit as a publishing category targeting young women in the late 1990s and early 2000s, publishers on both sides of the Atlantic hoped that lad lit could be a parallel category selling to young men. But lad lit never really took off: promoting novels as part of a subculture that celebrated boorish behaviour and to a demographic (young men) that rarely bought books was, arguably, an idea doomed to failure.

As a critical term
In 2002 the critic E. Showalter enthusiastically embraced the concept of lad lit, proposing extending the term to cover earlier fictions stretching from the works of Kingsley Amis in the 1950s and 60s to Martin Amis (The Rachel Papers, 1973) and Bret Easton Ellis (Less than Zero, 1985 and The Rules of Attraction, 1987). Showalter excitedly explained:

Stretching from Kingsley to Martin Amis, Ladlit was comic in the traditional sense that it had a happy ending. It was romantic in the modern sense that it confronted men’s fear and final embrace of marriage and adult responsibilities. It was confessional in the postmodern sense that the male protagonists and unreliable first-person narrators betrayed beneath their bravado the story of their insecurities, panic, cold sweats, performance anxieties and phobias. At the low end of the market, Ladlit was the masculine equivalent of the Bridget Jones Phenomenon; at the high end of the high street, it was a masterly examination of male identity in contemporary Britain".

However, lad lit has not enjoyed further development as a critical term and the fourth edition of the Oxford Dictionary of Literary Terms describes it as "1990s marketing term".

Authors
Nick Hornby is considered to be the originator of the genre. His early novels, Fever Pitch (1992), High Fidelity (1995) and About a Boy (1997), each have a protagonist dominated by a typically masculine obsession (football, pop music, gadgetry) that reflects his inability to communicate with women.

Other authors associated with this new wave of fiction include: John O'Farrell, Things Can Only Get Better (1998); Tony Parsons, Man and Boy (1999); Tim Lott, White City Blue (1999); Mike Gayle, My Legendary Girlfriend (1999); Mark Barrowcliffe, Girlfriend 44 (2000); Matt Dunn,  The Ex-Boyfriend’s Handbook (2006); Danny Wallace, Yes Man (2008); Kyle Smith, Love Monkey (2009); Zack Love, Sex in the Title (2013).

See also
 Fratire

References

Literary genres